is a 2017 Japanese animated action fantasy film based on the Pretty Cure franchise created by Izumi Todo, and its fourteenth series, Kirakira Pretty Cure a la Mode. The film is directed by Yutaka Tsuchida, written by Isao Murayama, and produced by Toei Animation. The film was released in Japan on October 28, 2017 as a double feature with a 5-minute CG animated short film, .

Featuring the Pretty Cure teams from Witchy PreCure!, Ichika and others attend a patisseire competition in Paris, France.

Plot

Petit Dream Stars! Let's la Cookin'? Showtime!
The fairies: Pekorin, Mofurun, Pafu and Aroma are baking cookies together. Realizing that they've ran out of flour, Pekorin instructs Pafu to get more of the flour from a big container, but realizes that she got the wrong powder, as the cookie mix turns into a dragon. They flee as the dragon chases them, but Pekorin remembers and uses the Miracle Lights to stop the dragon. The dragon is then turned into pile of baked cookies, and the fairies soon decorates them, pleased with the outcome. But another dragon pops up, causing the fairies in shock.

Crisply! The Memory of Mille-feuille!
As Ichika and the others are doing a live demonstration in the Kirakira Patisserie in Paris, a sentinent evil whisk pops up and causes the girls to transform and fights the whisk. Then, a whisk curses Parfait, which causes her to revert to her fairy form as Cure Kirarin. Later that night at the sweets convention, Ciel encounters Jean Pierre, a patisserie who saved her and Pikario from flock of crows years prior. He invites the girls to his workshop, which Cook pops up from the recipe book, revealing as a self proclaimed assistant to Jean-Pierre. Ciel them makes a cream for Jean-Pierre, which he disapproves and scolds her as not to use her weak state of mind as an excuse.

The next day, Ciel's skills hasn't improved, which Ichika and the others help out and makes mille-feuille with her. As they finish baking, the evil whisk shows up again and curses the other contestants, which Pekorin deduced that the whisk is the culprit. Arriving at Jean-Pierre's workshop, Yukari also deduces that Cook is culprit behind the whisk and Jean-Pierre's odd behavior. Cook lets the experimental sweets loose in the city, which the Cures went to stop them, but Cook also manages to turn other Cures into animals that oppose their themes. Then, Witchy PreCure! team: Cures Miracle, Magical and Felice arrives and tackles rest of Cook's minions. The Cures arrives to Jean-Pierre's basement, but are too late, as Cook pushes Jean-Pierre into the batter, turning him into an Ultimate Sweet.

Ciel tries to transform as the curse is preventing her to do so, but with the power of the Miracle Lights, the Cures are not only uplifted from their curses, but also gains an upgraded form. Cook discourages the Cures, but Macaron realizes that Cook was one of the aspiring patisseires that was betrayed by humans. The Cures then decorates the mille-feuille, and gives it to Jean-Pierre, freeing him from Cook's influences. In her last effort, Cook becomes an Ultimate Sweet and tries to attack the Cures, but the mille-feuille becomes a special Animal Sweet, which the Cures uses its powers and attacks Cook with "Pretty Cure Animal Go Round". In the end, Ciel is awarded as a runner-up in the award ceremony, but isn't discouraged and vows to be victorious next time.

During the credits, the Cures places the Eiffel Tower back to its original place, while Jean-Pierre finds an apprentice that looks like Cook.

Voice cast
Karen Miyama as Ichika Usami/Cure Whip
Haruka Fukuhara as Himari Arisugawa/Cure Custard
Tomo Muranaka as Aoi Tategami/Cure Gelato
Saki Fujita as Yukari Kotozume/Cure Macaron
Nanako Mori as Akira Tenjō/Cure Chocolat
Inori Minase as Kirarin/Ciel Kirahoshi/Cure Parfait
Mika Kanai as Pekorin
Yū Mizushima as Elder
Junko Minagawa as Pikario
Rie Takahashi as Mirai Asahina/Cure Miracle
Yui Horie as Riko Izayoi/Cure Magical
Saori Hayami as Kotoha Hanami/Cure Felice
Ayaka Saitō as Mofurun
Onoe Matsuya II as Jean-Pierre Zylberstein
Aoi Yūki as Cook

Nao Tōyama and Shiho Kokido, voices of Pafu and Aroma from Go! Princess PreCure series reprised their roles for the Petit Dream Stars! Let's la Cookin'? Showtime! short.

Production
On June 2017, it was announced that a standalone film for Kirakira Pretty Cure a la Mode was announced. Yutaka Tsuchida, who directed Pretty Cure All Stars: Singing with Everyone♪ Miraculous Magic!, is directing the film, with Isao Murayama, who wrote the Pretty Cure All Stars DX trilogy and Witchy PreCure! series is providing the screenplay, and Pretty Cure episode animation director Katsumi Tamegai is providing the character designs and chief animation direction for the film. On September of that year, it was announced that Onoe Matsuya II and Aoi Yūki were cast as Jean-Pierre Zylberstein and Cook respectively, and also announced that the film will feature main Pretty Cure teams from Witchy PreCure! the following month.

Release
The film was released in theaters in Japan on October 28, 2017 as a double feature with a 5-minute CG animated short film, Petit Dream Stars! Let's la Cookin'? Showtime!.

Reception

Box office
The film ranked number 1 out of top 10 in the Japanese box office in its opening weekend.

References

External links

2010s Japanese films
2017 anime films
Pretty Cure films
Toei Animation films
Japanese magical girl films
Crossover anime and manga
Films scored by Yuki Hayashi
Films set in Paris